The president or chief of police is the head of the national police, the Slovak Police Force, in Slovakia.

List

References

Slovak
Police Force Presidents